Lubei District is a district of the city of Tangshan, Hebei, People's Republic of China. The district's population totaled 743,504 as of 2010.

History 
Lubei District was first established in 1955, but was merged into Lunan District and the now-defunct  the following year. Lubei District was re-established in 1963.

In February 2021, the Hebei Provincial Government upgraded Guoyuan from a township to a town, reflecting the area's increased urbanization.

Administrative divisions
Lubei District administers 11 subdistricts and 2 towns.

Subdistricts 

Towns 

Demographics 
In recent decades, the population of Lubei District has steadily increased. The 2010 Chinese Census reported the district's population to be 743,504, up significantly from the 567,476 reported in the 2000 Chinese Census. A 1996 estimate put the district's population at about 472,000.

Economy 
Tangsteel Group is headquartered in Lubei District. The district is home to the Tangshan New Technology Development Zone.

Culture 

The , a museum commemorating Tangshan's industrial history, is located in Lubei District.

References

External links

County-level divisions of Hebei
Tangshan